A hoax or urban legend states that the United States Constitution was originally written on hemp paper. According to National Constitution Center, this is not true, as the document was written on parchment. Some sources say that drafts of the document were or may have been written on hemp paper, but this is also refuted by PolitiFact.

Footnotes

References

Cannabis hoaxes
Constitution of the United States